The following terms are in everyday use in financial regions, such as commercial business and the management of large organisations such as corporations.

Noun phrases

Verb phrases

See also
 Buzzwords
 Corporate communication
 Corporate jargon
 Doublespeak
 Euphemism
 Obfuscation

References

Terms
Business
Wikipedia glossaries using tables